Foreign relations between Argentina and South Korea, have existed for decades. Diplomatic relations between both countries were established on February 15, 1962.  Argentina has an embassy in Seoul and South Korea has an embassy in Buenos Aires.

Economic Relations

In 2016, bilateral trade between Argentina and South Korea was worth US$1.746 billion. Argentine exports to South Korea amounted to US$860.26 million and South Korean exports to Argentina amounted to US$885.61 million.

See also 
 Foreign relations of Argentina
 Foreign relations of South Korea

References

2. Paz Iriberri, Gonzalo S., "Las relaciones entre Argentina y Corea del Sur. Evolución y perspectivas", Estudios Internacionales, Universidad de Chile. Vol. 34 Núm. 134 (2001): Abril - Junio.

External links 
   List of Treaties ruling relations Argentina and South Korea (Argentine Foreign Ministry, in Spanish)
  Argentine embassy in Seoul
  South Korean Ministry of Foreign Affairs and Trade about relations with Argentina
  South Korean embassy in Buenos Aires

 
Korea, South
Bilateral relations of South Korea